Chełpina  (formerly German Neu Helpe) is a settlement in the administrative district of Gmina Recz, within Choszczno County, West Pomeranian Voivodeship, in north-western Poland.

References

Villages in Choszczno County